Numark Ltd is a chain of independent pharmacies in the UK. With 3000 outlets throughout England, Wales, Scotland and Northern Ireland, they are the largest such chain in the UK.

Each pharmacy business within Numark is an independently owned outlet, but membership of Numark allows individual retailers to take advantage of group purchasing deals to reduce their costs. This model is known as a symbol group, or virtual chain. Numark also offers marketing support, such as signage, advertising and demographic research for product targeting purposes, to its members.

Numark has a range of Own Brand products such as vitamins, otc medicines and toiletries.

Numark central office is based in Tamworth, Staffordshire.

External links

Numark membership hits 2,500 - Chemist & Druggist website

Pharmacies of the United Kingdom
Retail companies of the United Kingdom
Pharmacy brands